Herman L. "Bubba" Scott (April 24, 1927 – March 11, 2012) was an  American football coach and athletics administrator. He served as the head football coach at Howard College—now known as Samford University— in Homewood, Alabama from 1963 to 1965 and as the executive director of the Alabama High School Athletic Association from 1966 to 1990.

Head coaching record

College

References

External links
 Alabama Sports Hall of Fame profile

1927 births
2012 deaths
Samford Bulldogs football coaches
Troy Trojans football players
High school football coaches in Alabama
People from Prattville, Alabama
Players of American football from Alabama